Al Luqta is a district of Al Rayyan City in Qatar, located in the municipality of Al Rayyan.

Etymology
The district's name originates from the Arabic word "luqeet", which is the term designated for an abandoned infant whose parents have not been identified. At the time of its naming, the district was situated in an isolated and largely unknown area, thus, its name is figurative for its geographic location.

Geography
The districts of Al Shagub to the west and Gharrafat Al Rayyan to the north-west host Education City as well as other facilities belonging to Qatar Foundation.

History
J.G. Lorimer mentioned Al Luqta in 1908 in his Gazetteer of the Persian Gulf, remarking that it appeared to be one of the only seven villages in Qatar that had sizable date palm plantations.

Landmarks
Chinese Health Centre (Ladies Branch) on Al Rayhan Street.
Syrian American Medical Centre on Al Luqta Street.
Dar Mona Hassan Al Benali Quran Learning for Women on Sahat Al Beday Street.
Ministry of Education Training Centre on Uhud Street.
Hejen Racing Committee, the country's camel racing authority, has its headquarters on Al Diyaa Street.
Al Luqta Weaponry Museum on Al Maha Street. The Weaponry Museum features around 2,300 distinct firearms, swords and daggers, some of which belong to former members of the ruling family of Qatar. Also included among the exhibits are weapons dating back to the Ottoman era and Persian-style rifles.
Al Luqta Children's Park on the corner of Al Maha Street and Al Najah Street. It has two playgrounds, a cafeteria, a prayer room, and an administrative building.

Embassies
 U.S. Embassy in Qatar

Education
The following schools are located in Al Luqta:

References

Populated places in Al Rayyan